Loay, officially the Municipality of Loay,  is a 5th class municipality in the province of Bohol, Philippines. According to the 2020 census, it has a population of 17,855 people.

Located at the mouth of the Loboc River, the municipality can be divided into a lower and an upper part. The lower part used to be called Canipaan because of the presence of nipa swamps in this part of the town, while the upper part is named Ibabao, being located on a plateau.

Recent historical research found that instead of being in Bool, Tagbilaran, the actual site of the Blood Compact between Legazpi and Sikatuna may be in barangay Hinawanan. Loay is also known for the many antiques discovered in its soils, thus indicating a civilization before the Spanish came to Bohol: it has become an haven for the treasure hunters.

The town of Loay, Bohol celebrates its feast in May (the date is movable), to honor the town patron Santisima Trinidad/Blessed Trinity

History

During the period 1751–1754, Loay was a small village called Santissima Trinidad located at the strip of the Loboc River, as mentioned in the accounts of Father Juan .

As a visita, it formerly belonged to the Municipality of Loboc. It was separated from the Loboc mission in 1795, although some state 1815 as the foundation date, and  reflects that it became an independent parish in 1799.

The church and belfry of Loay were severely damaged by the 2013 earthquake.

On April 27, 2022, the old Clarin Bridge carrying National Route 850 (N850) over the Loboc River in Loay collapsed, killing 4 people and injuring 15. The bridge was damaged during the 2013 earthquake and still being used while a new replacement bridge was under construction next to it. One possible cause was the stationary traffic on the bridge that exceeded its capacity.

Geography

Barangays
Loay comprises 24 barangays:

Climate

Demographics

Economy

Tourism

Loay is one of the locations to take a Loboc river lunch cruise.

References

Sources

External links

 [ Philippine Standard Geographic Code]
Municipality of Loay
Loay

Municipalities of Bohol